Hidden Treasures Fanta Miss Nepal 2015, the 18th annual Miss Nepal beauty pageant was held on April 18 at the Hotel Annapurna in Kathmandu. Miss Nepal 2014 Subin Limbu crowned her successor Evana Manandhar as Miss Nepal World 2015, who represented Nepal at the Miss World 2015. Similarly, Dibyata Vaidya was declared the 1st runner up as Miss Nepal Earth 2015 sent to Miss Earth 2015 and Medha Koirala was the 2nd runner up as Miss Nepal International 2015 sent to Miss International 2015.

The winner of Miss Nepal 2015 was selected as the brand ambassador of drink, Fanta; WWF Nepal for a year and won Rs. 100,000. The auditions of Miss Nepal were held in various regional contests like Biratnagar, Birgunj, Chitwan, Pokhara, Butwal & Kathmandu where all the selected candidates made it to top 19 finalists. All three winners also got a Gionee phone and an apartment at Suncity apartments by Shangrila.

The 19 shortlisted young women aged 19 years and above competed for the main title and the pageant was live telecasted on NTV and NTV PLUS.

Results

Color keys

Sub-titles

Contestants

References

External links
Miss Nepal Website
Evana Manandhar - Miss Nepal 2015 Website
Miss Nepal Official Website

Beauty pageants in Nepal
Nepal
2015 in Nepal
Miss Nepal